Modern steeplechase races have an average of just over 4 equine fatalities for every 1,000 horses taking part, according to the British Horseracing Authority. However, the Grand National, a popular steeplechase held annually in England, yielded 7 fatalities out of 439 horses taking part between 2000 and 2010.

The Grand National is a National Hunt handicap race over a distance of 4 miles 3½ furlongs and over 30 fences at Aintree Racecourse near Liverpool. The high number of equine deaths in the race has made it a target for animal rights activists. While course officials have repeatedly taken safety measures over the years, such as improving veterinary facilities and reducing the severity of fences, some have campaigned for further modifications or the abolition of the event that was inaugurated in 1839.

After the 1989 Grand National, in which two horses died in incidents at Becher's Brook (the sixth and 22nd fence on the course), Aintree began making significant changes to the fences that are jumped during the National. The brook on the landing-side of Becher's was filled in to prevent horses rolling back into it, and the incline on the landing-side has been mostly levelled out, whilst retaining a drop to slow the runners. Other fences have been reduced in height, toe-boards have been made taller, and the entry requirements for participating horses have been made stricter, such as the requirement for runners to have been placed fourth or better in a previous recognised steeplechase over a distance of at least three miles.

Some within the horseracing community, including some with notable achievements in the Grand National, such as Ginger McCain and Bob Champion, have argued that the lowering of fences and the narrowing of ditches, primarily designed to increase horse safety, has had the adverse effect by encouraging the runners to race faster. During the 1970s and 1980s the Grand National saw a total of 12 horses die (half of which were at Becher's Brook); in the next 20-year period from 1990 to 2010, when modifications to the course were most significant, there were 17 equine fatalities.

List of fatalities

The animal welfare charity League Against Cruel Sports counts the number of horse deaths at 40 over the three-day meet from the year 2000 to 2013. The following list details the equine fatalities during, or as a direct result of participating in, the Grand National, that is, the showpiece steeplechase itself rather than all the various races held over the entire three-day "Grand National meeting" (which includes two other races over one circuit of the National course: the Fox Hunters for amateur jockeys and the Topham for professional jockeys). It includes, where applicable and where known, the fence at which the fatality occurred.

Summary by fence
The following table summarises the total number of equine fatalities by each of the 16 fences on the course, and includes the current height of each.

See also
Overview of the Grand National fences
 Race Horse Death Watch

References

Aintree Racecourse
Fatalities